Wiking or Wikings, German for Viking, may refer to:

Wiking (horse), an Arabian racehorse.
Blohm & Voss BV 222 Wiking, a World War II flying boat
Wiking Modellbau, a German maker of scale models
5th SS Panzer Division Wiking, a Waffen SS panzer division
WIKING Helikopter Service, a German helicopter operator
Wiking-Jugend, a German neo-Nazi organisation

Wiking is also a surname:

 Mats Wiking (born 1961), Swedish politician

See also
 SS Wiking, a series of ships of the WWII Kriegsmarine
 SS Wiking, several ships of that series, captured by the British Royal Navy and converted to Empire Ships, see List of Empire ships (U–Z)
Viking (disambiguation)